In military terms, 127th Division or 127th Infantry Division may refer to:

 127th Division (People's Republic of China)
 127th Division (Imperial Japanese Army)
127th Machine Gun Artillery Division (Soviet Union/Russia), 1990-c2009
127th Motor Rifle Division (Russia), 2018-present
127th Motor Rifle Division (Soviet Union), 1957-1992